Celedon Camaso (born March 16, 1973) is a Filipino former professional basketball player for the Judiciary Magis of the UNTV Cup. He previously played for numerous teams in the Philippine Basketball Association, the most recent being Red Bull Barako.  He was directly taken by Mobiline in 2000.

Player profile
Camaso who started playing for the Manila Metrostars in the Metropolitan Basketball Association during the 1999 season of the league and he won the championship with Romel Adducul, Alex Compton, Ruben dela Rosa, etc.

Camaso is a forward who started his PBA career with the Talk 'N Text Phone Pals. He was most notable for winning the 1998 ABC-PBA and 1998 PBA Slam Dunk contests. He was traded to Red Bull in part of the Romel Adducul deal. He was waived by the Red Bull Barako in the 2008 PBA Fiesta Conference.

He is currently playing for the Judiciary Magis in the UNTV Cup. He is with the team since the inaugural 2013 season, where they became the first UNTV Cup champions.

He played for the Brunei Barracudas at the newly established ASEAN Basketball League from 2009–10. He was signed as an import by the Satria Muda BritAma of Indonesia for the 2010–11 season.

External links
Player Profile
PBA-Online! Profile
Brunei's Barracudas Land Don Camaso

1973 births
Living people
Alaska Aces (PBA) players
Barako Bull Energy Boosters players
Basketball players from Metro Manila
Filipino men's basketball players
People from Caloocan
Power forwards (basketball)
Small forwards
Magnolia Hotshots players
TNT Tropang Giga players
Filipino expatriate basketball people in Brunei